Kapil Mishra (born 13 November 1980) is an Indian politician from Delhi. Before joining the Bharatiya Janata Party in 2019, Mishra was an Aam Aadmi Party MLA representing Karawal Nagar (Delhi Assembly constituency) in the Sixth Legislative Assembly of Delhi.

He was inducted as a Water Resource Minister in Arvind Kejriwal cabinet led AAP government of NCT Delhi, he was removed by Arvind Kejriwal from his ministry over corruption found in his ministry works, later he accused Arvind Kejriwal of corruption along with Satyendra Kumar Jain. Afterward, he sought appointments with the Anti-Corruption Bureau of Delhi to lodge his complaints, regarding 2 crores of bribe money which he alleged had been exchanged, but could not prove it. Later on, the Lokayukta dropped Kejriwal's name from the case.

Mishra later alleged more instances of corruption in the AAP government under Arvind Kejriwal. Being a member and MLA of Aam Aadmi Party (AAP), he was supporting, sharing stage events for Bharatiya Janata Party (BJP) and was also campaigning against his own party AAP in 2019 Indian general election. These events and instances of anti-party activities were brought to the notice of the Speaker Ram Niwas Goel of Delhi Legislative Assembly by his former colleague MLA Saurabh Bhardwaj. After due process of proceedings and observations been conducted by the Legislative Speaker under rule of paragraph 2(1)(a) of the tenth schedule of the Indian constitution on grounds of defection and anti-party activities, Mishra was disqualified as an MLA of Delhi. After few days of getting disqualified as an MLA, Kapil Mishra joined BJP in presence of senior BJP leaders of Delhi Manoj Tiwari, Vijay Goel, Vijender Gupta, Satish Upadhyay and others.

Activism
As co-founder and coordinator of "Youth for Justice", a New Delhi based youth action group that works on spontaneous issues that need cognizance, he has led the youth protest on various socio-economic issues including Jessica Lal murder trial, issues of Farmers suicides in various parts of country, encroachment on Yamuna River bed and various other issues.

He protested against the cases of corruption in Commonwealth Games 2010 held in New Delhi and has written a pamphlet "It's Common v/s Wealth" highlighting the various scams and social and environmental concerns related with CWG 2010. Since 2007, He raised his voice against the anti-people development approach that is being practiced by authorities in the name of Commonwealth Games in New Delhi.

He raised his voice inside Delhi Assembly against exploitation of Yamuna in the name of Commonwealth Games and got detained for the action. He has initiated and participated in several protests against exploitation of common people and common resources in the name of "Growth and Development".

He has also prepared a report as citizen journalist for CNN-IBN on encroachment on river Yamuna and also has exposed the issues of violation of labor laws at Games sites by camping outside Games village along with other members of "Youth for Justice".

He raised his voice and filled a Public Interest Litigation (PIL) in Supreme Court for adequate compensation for Vishnu Tiwari, a falsely accused rape convict who was declared innocent after spending 20 years in jail under the SC/ST Act.

Political career
Mishra contested the 2015 Delhi Legislative Assembly election as the AAP candidate from Karawal Nagar constituency. He won the election, defeating his rival BJP candidate Mohan Singh Bisht by a margin of 44,431 votes.

In 2017, the AAP Government sacked him from the post of Water Minister of Delhi. Later submitted documents to the Anti-Corruption Branch (ACB) to back his allegations that Delhi CM Arvind Kejriwal delayed the probe into an Rs.400 crore tanker scam. Kapil Mishra was suspended from the party’s primary membership a day after he leveled corruption charges against Arvind Kejriwal and his former cabinet colleague Satyendra Kumar Jain. However, his opponents allege that his allegations have turned out to be baseless as CBI and Lokayukta gave him a clean chit in this alleged ₹2 Cr. bribery case.

On 2 August 2019, he was disqualified from the Legislative Assembly under the anti-defection law. He officially joined Bharatiya Janta Party on 17 August 2019.

Controversies

2020 Delhi Assembly election
In January 2020, he stirred up a controversy when he likened the upcoming 2020 Delhi Legislative Assembly election to an India versus Pakistan contest. He tweeted, "There will be a contest on Delhi Roads between India and Pakistan on February 8". A show-cause notice was issued to Mishra by the Delhi poll authorities for "violation of the model code of conduct and the Representation of the People Act". Election Commission of India also imposed a 48-hour campaigning ban on him over his controversial tweets which tried to aggravate differences between two communities.

North East Delhi Riots

On 23 February 2020,  Mishra publicly spoke out in a rally against the anti-CAA protesters, in the presence of the DCP of North East Delhi district, Ved Prakash Surya. Mishra tried to intimidate the police to remove the protesters from Jaffrabad and Chand Bagh areas in three days' time, allegedly threatening to take matters into his own hands, "hit the streets" and "not remain peaceful" in the event of their failure. After the rally, Mishra himself posted a video of him threatening the police on Twitter. Within a few hours of Kapil Mishra's rally, violent clashes started between the supporters and the people against CAA.

Relatives of the people who died in the violence accused Mishra of inciting the clashes and asked for his immediate arrest and strict punishment. The father of a victim Rahul Solanki claimed that Mishra instigated the fire and returned to his home, while their children are becoming victims of the violence. He added that people will continue losing their children until Mishra was arrested.

BJP's East Delhi MP, Gautam Gambhir, on 25 February stated that "Kapil Mishra's speech is not acceptable" and asked for strict action to be taken against the people responsible for violence, regardless of which political party they belonged to.

Three complaints (two police complaints for a report and one plea to the Supreme Court of India) have been filed against Kapil Mishra for allegedly inciting violence. The complaints alleged that Mishra had made inflammatory remarks publicly, inciting people and causing the violence. The police has taken no action against Mishra as of 25 February. On 25 February, Mishra wrote in series of tweets that he was not scared of the "massive hate campaign" against him for "speaking truth" and supporting CAA. He had tweeted a video and written "Jaffrabad has been vacated, there won't be another Shaheen Bagh" on same day.

On 26 February, the Delhi High Court played the video clip of Kapil Mishra's speech in the court while hearing the plea. The court then asked the police to take "conscious decision" while filing cases related to the hate speeches made by the three BJP leaders Kapil Mishra, Anurag Thakur and Parvesh Verma.

Personal life
Mishra is the son of Annapurna Mishra, a former mayor of East Delhi affiliated with the BJP and Rameshwar Mishra "Pankaj", a former socialist leader, thinker and author. Mishra completed his education from Dr. Bhim Rao Ambedkar College.

Footnotes

References

External links 

Kapil Mishra
Official Website on Twitter

Activists from Delhi
Living people
1980 births
Bharatiya Janata Party politicians from Delhi